The Imperial College COVID-19 Response Team is a group of experts from Imperial College London studying the COVID-19 pandemic and informing the government of the United Kingdom, and governments and public health agencies around the world. The team comprises scientists from the MRC Centre for Global Infectious Disease Analysis, the Jameel Institute, the Imperial College Business School and the Department of Mathematics. The Imperial College COVID-19 Response Team is led by Professor Neil Ferguson, Director of the Jameel Institute and MRC GIDA.

On 16 March 2020 the Imperial College COVID-19 Response Team produced a research forecast of various scenarios for spread of the disease in the United Kingdom and the United States. Without any mitigation their forecast showed local health care capabilities vastly overwhelmed by the epidemic wave. Periodic cycles of quarantine followed by softer social distancing were recommended, with quarantines in effect two-thirds of the time. On 30 March, a study on 11 European countries was published. It provided estimates of the situation as of 28 March (observed and modelised with CovidSim), and projections for 31 March given current expectations, no action, and the difference. It also provided a list of government policies and their respective absolute dates. As of 2 May 2021, the Imperial College COVID-19 Response Team has produced 43 reports.

Reports

Estimates

11 European countries estimates on 28 March 2020

World estimates for 3 strategies

See also 
 Non-pharmaceutical intervention (epidemiology)
 Jameel Institute

References

External links 
 COVID-19 Response Team Reports
 Jameel Institute for Disease and Emergency Analytics (J-IDEA)
 

Imperial College Faculty of Medicine
Organizations established for the COVID-19 pandemic
COVID-19 pandemic in the United Kingdom